Stefan Scriggins is an Australian Olympic boxer. He represented his country in the Welterweight division at the 1992 Summer Olympics. He won his first bout against Francisco Moniz, and then lost his second bout to Aníbal Santiago Acevedo.

References

1970 births
Living people
Boxers from Leicester
Australian male boxers
Olympic boxers of Australia
Boxers at the 1992 Summer Olympics
Commonwealth Games medallists in boxing
Commonwealth Games bronze medallists for Australia
Boxers at the 1990 Commonwealth Games
AIBA World Boxing Championships medalists
Welterweight boxers
Medallists at the 1990 Commonwealth Games